Heaven Deconstruction is an experimental instrumental album by The Young Gods released on July 29, 1997.

Track listing
 "December" - 6:04
 "Aoaçu" - 2:48
 "Acid Strangel" - 5:27
 "Improper" - 5:25
 "Drun" - 4:37
 "Riversky" - 4:49
 "F" - 3:21
 "Borea" - 4:58
 "Scories" - 0:56
 "Landing" - 5:51
 "Messages" - 3:11
 "Nano Pata" - 1:48
 "Lova" - 4:45
 "Light Residues" - 2:24
 "Under" - 6:15
 "Numière" - 6:39
 "Windklang" - 4:25

References 

The Young Gods albums
1996 albums
Albums produced by Roli Mosimann